The Secret Wire is a 1916 American silent short romantic drama written and directed by Thomas Ricketts. The film stars Harold Lockwood and May Allison and centers on a melodramatic rescue.

Cast
 Harold Lockwood
 May Allison
 William Stowell
 Harry von Meter

External links
 

1916 films
1916 romantic drama films
American romantic drama films
American silent short films
American black-and-white films
1916 short films
Films directed by Tom Ricketts
1910s American films
Silent romantic drama films
Silent American drama films